Free Citizens (Greek: Ελεύθεροι Πολίτες) is a political party, that was founded in November 2011 by the independent deputy Vasilis Oikonomou, who had voted "present" in the vote for the memorandum and afterwards was expelled from the parliamentary group of the Panhellenic Socialist Movement (PASOK), and other 250 people who withdrew from the political party Panhellenic Citizen Chariot.

Apart from parliament deputies and former ministers, personalities of the local self-government as well as representatives of the youth and social movements also take part in the organization.

On March 22, 2012 Vasilis Oikonomou joined the Democratic Left (DIMAR) party and is a member of the parliamentary group for Democratic Left party.

On October 4, 2012 V. Oikonomou and 100 more members of the party joined DIMAR as its members. On December 17, 2012 the majority of the party decided to expel V. Oikonomou and 26 more members and then announced the dissolution of its coalition with DIMAR.

The Free Citizens (Free Youth) is the party's youth organisation.

References

External links

Social democratic parties in Greece
Political parties established in 2011
2011 establishments in Greece